Bushnell Peak is a prominent mountain summit in the Sangre de Cristo Range of the Rocky Mountains of North America. Bushnell Peak is the highest point in Fremont County.

Mountain

See also

List of mountain peaks of Colorado
List of the most prominent summits of Colorado
List of Colorado county high points

References

External links

Mountains of Colorado
Mountains of Fremont County, Colorado
Mountains of Saguache County, Colorado
Rio Grande National Forest
San Isabel National Forest
Sangre de Cristo Mountains
North American 3000 m summits